Battleground is a mockumentary comedy-drama television web series created by J. D. Walsh streamed on Hulu. The show follows a group of political campaign staffers working to elect a dark horse candidate to the U.S. Senate in the battleground state of Wisconsin. Walsh serves as executive producer alongside Hagai Shaham and Marc Webb.

The show marks Hulu's first foray into original scripted programming. It premiered online on February 14, 2012.

In December 2017, it was announced that the series was being revived as a podcast by UK 3's The World At Large series. The first three episodes of season two were made available on iTunes on December 3, 2017.

Overview
The series chronicles the inner workings of a Democratic Party candidate for a U.S. Senate seat in Wisconsin. Led by campaign manager Chris "Tak" Davis, the team battles against corrupt politicians and staff infighting while campaigning for a distant third-place candidate.

Cast

Starring
Jay Hayden as Chris "Tak" Davis, Campaign Manager
Teri Reeves as Kara "KJ" Jamison, Head of Media Strategy
Jack DeSena as Cole Graner, Speechwriter
Ben Samuel as Ben Werner, volunteer
Jordan T. Maxwell as Jordan T. Mosley, the candidate's step-son
Lindsey Payne as Lindsey Cutter, volunteer
Alison Haislip as Ali Laurents, Social Media Director
Meighan Gerachis as Deirdre Samuels, the candidate
Sam White as George Mosley, the candidate's husband

Guest Starring
John Kishline as Jack Makers, the incumbent
Matt Corboy as Michael Corboy, Makers campaign manager
Kelly O'Sullivan as Sarah, Tak's wife
Ray Wise as Frank "D-Day" Davis, Tak's father

Production
In October 2010, Fox gave a script commitment to the series, which was being written by J. D. Walsh and executive-produced by Walsh and Marc Webb, with 20th Century Fox Television as the attached studio at the time. Fox later passed on making the show. Walsh shot a 20-minute pilot funded by family members. He said no television network was willing to air the series due to its politics-related theme. Hulu later stepped in to produce the series.

Battleground is set in Wisconsin, the childhood home of long-time friends Walsh and Webb. Walsh has also worked for Massachusetts Senator John Kerry in a previous political campaign. In a press release, he said: "People hate politics but they love elections. Campaigns are about good versus evil, our team versus yours, relationships, temptations, power, unimaginable triumphs and heartbreaking defeats. I’m interested in the people behind the people."

The first season was filmed in Walsh's hometown of Madison, Wisconsin, with sets ranging from local homes to a local elementary school. Walsh said he chose to film in Madison instead of Los Angeles because he had a better feel for the people, places and politics and there was a "sense of excitement" among the locals to be a part of the project. As many as 90 local actors were cast. Local WKOW anchors Greg Jeschke and Sabrina Hall appeared in a fake broadcast. To stage large crowds, real-life scenes of fans heading to a University of Wisconsin–Madison football game were used. Walsh calls the show "a love letter to Madison".

Episodes

Television: Season 1 (2012)
The first season consists of 13 episodes. The series premiere was made available online on February 14, 2012. New episodes were made available each subsequent week on Hulu.

Podcast: Season 2 (2017-18)

Broadcast
In its first ever appearance at the Television Critics Association (TCA) press tour on January 15, 2012, Internet streaming site Hulu announced that it will be airing the series online. Hulu's senior vice president of content Andy Forssell said the site picked up the series because it "saw a spark" and "[w]e see what J.D. [Walsh] sees in it and we know the audience is there."

Battleground is Hulu's first original scripted series. The series, along with Hulu's other original documentary series, is available for free rather than on the subscription-based Hulu Plus to enable the site to build its user base and reputation for original programming. The show premiered on February 14, 2012, with a new episode made available online each subsequent week.

Reception
Battlegrounds first episode received mixed to positive reviews, with critics noting its relatively low production value but strong writing. The Associated Press's Jake Coyle described the show as a "light, watered-down knockoff of The Office" that comes off like a "student fantasy of playful politics." David Hinckley of the Daily News said the show "parlays [a solid professional cast] into some good jokes, political and otherwise" but viewers "should not expect that ... the look of the show will match what they see on broadcast or cable." Dean Robbins of local newspaper Isthmus called the first episode worthy of comparison to sophisticated modern sitcoms, saying it "distinguishes itself with strong writing and acting, not to mention a distinctive setting."

References

External links
Battleground at Hulu

2010s American comedy-drama television series
2012 American television series debuts
2012 American television series endings
Hulu original programming
Television shows set in Wisconsin
2010s American political television series
2010s American mockumentary television series
Political web series
American comedy web series
Political mockumentaries
American satirical websites